Motonari Higuchi is a Japanese race car driver who competed in twelve All-Japan Formula Three Championship in 2000 and 2001 for the Nobel France team. He also drove in one Japanese Formula 3000 race in 1995 at Mine Circuit.

References

Japanese Formula 3000 Championship drivers
Japanese Formula 3 Championship drivers
Japanese racing drivers
Living people
Year of birth missing (living people)